The Volkswagen Passat is a series of large family cars manufactured and marketed by the German automobile manufacturer Volkswagen since 1973, and now in its eighth generation. It has been marketed variously as the Dasher, Santana, Quantum, Magotan, Corsar and Carat. The successive generations of the Passat carry the Volkswagen internal designations B1, B2, etc.

A "four-door coupé" variant of the Passat was released in the North American market in 2008 as the Passat CC, which was then renamed to Volkswagen CC.

In January 2011, Volkswagen debuted another Passat model, internally designated Volkswagen New Midsize Sedan or NMS, that would be manufactured at the Volkswagen Chattanooga Assembly Plant. SAIC-Volkswagen also manufactures the Passat NMS in its Nanjing factory. The Passat NMS is sold in the North America, South Korea, China, and Middle East. The separate B8 Passat model entered production in Europe in 2014, based on the MQB platform.

In 2019, the Passat NMS program was split into two as the North American one continued being produced on an older platform while the Chinese Passat moved on to the MQB platform, meaning that Volkswagen marketed three models under the Passat nameplate globally at that time. The North American Passat was phased out after the 2022 model year.

B1 (Typ 32; 1973) 

The first generation Passat launched in 1973 in two- and four-door sedan and three- and five-door versions. Externally all four shared styling by Giorgetto Giugiaro. The first generation Passat was a fastback variant of the mechanically identical Audi 80 sedan, introduced a year earlier. A five-door station wagon was introduced in 1974, which in North American markets was sold as an Audi Fox. In Europe, the Passat was equipped with two rectangular, two round 7-inch, or four round 5.5-inch headlights depending on specification. The Passat was one of the most modern European family cars at the time, and was intended as a replacement for the ageing Volkswagen Type 3 and Type 4. The only other European cars of its size to feature front-wheel drive and a hatchback were the Renault 16 and Austin Maxi.

The Passat originally featured the four-cylinder OHC 1.3-litre and 1.5-litre (/) petrol engines also used in the Audi 80—longitudinally mounted with front-wheel drive, in Audi tradition, with either a four-speed manual transmission or three-speed automatic. It had a MacPherson strut front suspension with a solid axle/coil spring setup at the rear.

The SOHC 1.5-litre was enlarged to 1.6-litre in August 1975 with unchanged power ratings and slightly higher torque ratings. In July 1978, the Passat Diesel became available, equipped with the VW Golf's 1.5-litre diesel, followed in February 1979 by the Passat GLI with a fuel-injected version of the 1.6-litre engine.

The range received a facelift in 1977 (launched 1978 outside Europe) with revised interior and revised exterior with repositioned indicators and depending on model, either four round or two rectangular headlights.

In North America, the car was marketed as the Volkswagen Dasher. The three-door hatchback, four-door sedan, and a station wagon model launched in North America for and during the 1974 model year. North American cars were equipped with single DOT standard headlights.

In 1978, the Dasher received a facelift along the lines of the European Passat, with quad sealed beam headlights and big polyurethane covered bumpers. The trim was also upgraded and the ride softened. 1979 saw the introduction of the 1.5-litre diesel engine, which produced just 48 PS (35 kW) in the  car. 0–100 km/h time for the Diesel was 19.4 seconds, 6.2 seconds slower than the gasoline (petrol) engine. All gasoline engines were dropped for North America in 1981, in preparation for the next generation.

In Brazil, the Passat B1 was produced from June 1974 until 1988. Since the Audi 80 was not marketed in Brazil, the Passat received the Audi's different front-end treatment after a facelift for 1979. Originally with a 1.5-litre engine, during its long life cycle many improvements from the B2 platform were later introduced, like its 1.6 and 1.8-litre engines, a Brazil-specific face-lift in 1985, and a five-speed gearbox. A sports version, named Passat TS 1.6 and later Passat GTS 1.8 Pointer was also introduced.

B2 (Typ 32B; 1981) 

The second generation Passat launched in November 1980. The platform, named B2, was once again based on the corresponding version of the Audi 80, which had been launched in 1978. The B2 Passat was slightly longer.

In addition to the Passat hatchbacks and Variants (estate/wagon), there was also a conventional three-box saloon, which until the 1985 facelift was sold as the Volkswagen Santana in Europe. In the United States, the Passat/Santana was sold as the Volkswagen Quantum, available in three-door hatchback, four-door sedan, and a wagon model, but the five-door hatchback was never sold there and the three-door hatchback was dropped after less than two years. The four-wheel drive Syncro wagon version was introduced in October 1984, initially only with the more powerful five-cylinder engine.

The Passat/Santana was also produced and commercialized in China, Mexico, South America and South Africa, too. In Mexico, it was marketed from 1984 to 1988 as VW Corsar and Corsar Variant (the 4-door saloon and 5-door wagon, respectively). In Argentina, from 1987 to 1991 as the VW Carat. In Brazil, the wagon model was badged VW Quantum. The Passat saloon and estate were produced in South Africa for the local market until 1987.

Like the previous generation, the B2 Passat was mainly sold with four-cylinder petrol and diesel engines. Unlike its predecessor, however, top-of the line versions received five-cylinder Audi or VW engines of 1.9–2.2 litres. In addition to four- and five-speed manuals and three-speed automatic gearboxes, the Passat/Santana was also available with the 4+E transmission. This, also called the "Formel E" had a particularly long top gear, which combined with a freewheeling mechanism, provided better gas mileage. An automatic stop/start was also available in some markets. The four-wheel-drive system used in the Passat Variant Syncro shared the mechanics of the Audi 80 and not the Volkswagen Golf Syncro. The Syncro's bottom plate was almost entirely different, requiring a transmission tunnel, a relocated gas tank and no spare tire well (to make room for the complex rear axle assembly). Only the more popular estate was reengineered.

In 1985, the range received a slight facelift, consisting of new, larger bumpers, interior retouches, a new front grille and new taillights on the hatchback versions. The three-door hatchback was discontinued, while the Santana nameplate was dropped in Europe. The saloon's front end was now the same as the hatchback and estate.

On 31 March 1988, production ended (although Syncro models continued in production until June) with 3,345,248 built in Germany. World production totaled approximately 4.5 million units.

B3 and B4 (Typ 35i; 1988) 

The third generation Passat was introduced in March 1988 in Europe, 1990 in North America, and 1995 in South America. The lack of a grille made the car's front end styling reminiscent of older, rear-engined Volkswagens, such as the 411, and also doubled as a modern styling trend. The styling was developed from the 1981 aerodynamic (cd 0.25) Auto 2000 concept car.

At the time, it was the first transverse engine layout Passat to be built on a Volkswagen-designed platform, rather than sharing one with an Audi saloon. The car, although designated B3 in Volkswagen's platform nomenclature, was based largely on the A platform as used for the smaller Golf model, but was stretched in all directions, and therefore had no connection with the B3 series Audi 80, launched two years earlier. Many components are shared directly between these vehicles. This generation of Passat was sold as a four-door saloon or a five-door estate, with the Passat not being sold as a hatchback from this point onwards. It was marketed under the Passat name in all markets; in North America, this was a first.

The fuel-injected petrol engines gave better performance and refinement than the carburettor units previously used. They were mounted transversely, and the floorpan was engineered to accept Volkswagen's 'Syncro' four-wheel drive system. Engine options were the 2.0-litre 16-valve engine in the GL model, 1.8-litre engine in the CL model (not available in North America, all CLs, GLs, and GLSs had the 2.0 16v), The 1.8 8v 112 bhp PB engine from the Golf GTi was also used in the Passat GT model. Volkswagen's new 2.8-litre VR6 engine (also used in the Golf and Corrado) in the GLX/GLS model (introduced in 1991 in Europe and 1992 in North America), and the G60 engine (only available on the Syncro model in Canada for the North American market). The 1.9-litre and the 1.6-litre diesel engine were also available as options.

1993 facelift (Passat B4) 

The B3 Passat was heavily facelifted in 1993, and despite being designated B4, it was not an all-new model. The facelift revised external body panels except for the roof and glasshouse, with most obvious exterior change seeing the reintroduction of a grille to match the style of the other same-generation Volkswagen models of the era, such as the Mk3 Golf and Jetta. The interior was mildly updated and included safety equipment, such as dual front airbags and seat belt pretensioners, although the basic dashboard design remained unchanged. The grille was introduced to give the front end a more aggressive appearance, as the previous model looked too 'passive'.

It carried a US EPA fuel efficiency rating for the sedan of  highway. Combined with a   reserve option fuel tank, the B4 TDI wagon had an 1800+ km (1200+ mi) range on a single tank of fuel. The B4 TDI wagon saw less than 1,000 sales in the US during its 1996 to 1997 lifespan.

B5 (Typ 3B, 1997) and B5.5 (3BG; 2001) 

An all-new Passat, based on the Volkswagen Group B5 platform, was launched in February 1997 in Continental Europe and the United Kingdom, and 1998 in North America. Its PL45 platform was shared with the first-generation "Typ 8D" Audi A4, which was unveiled two years earlier, and saw a return to the Passat sharing its longitudinal engine layout platform with Audi's equivalent model for the first time since the second-generation (B2) Passat of 1981, which shared its platform with the second-generation "Typ 81" Audi 80/Audi 90 (the A4 is the successor to the Audi 80 line).

The Passat introduced a new design language, first seen on the Concept 1 concept car, for the latest generation of Volkswagens, such as the Mk4 Golf, Bora and Polo Mk4. Aerodynamic work gave the B5 Passat a coefficient of drag of 0.27 (saloon model).

The car featured a fully independent four-link front suspension; and a semi-independent torsion beam for front-wheel-drive models or a fully independent suspension on the 4motion 4WD models. 4WD was introduced in 1997 as an option for the 1.8-litre, 2.8-litre V6, 1.9-litre TDI, 2.0-litre TDI and 2.5-litre V6 TDI engines, using a second-generation Torsen T-2 based 4WD system to minimise loss of traction. The 1.8-litre petrol engine in the Passat and Audi A4 has a lower oil capacity than transverse applications of the same engine ( in transverse,  longitudinal), and may suffer from oil sludge problems as a result, if not changed at regular intervals with fully synthetic oils. Four transmission options were available: a 5-speed manual transmission, a 6-speed manual transmission (codename 01E), a 4-speed automatic transmission and a 5-speed automatic transmission with tiptronic.

The 1.6-litre petrol engine had been dropped by 1999, leaving the 1.8-litre 20-valve as the entry-level engine.

2001 facelift (Passat B5.5 – Typ 3BG) 

The B5.5 Passat began production in late 2000, with styling and mechanical revisions, including revised projector-optic headlights, bumpers, tail lights, and chrome trim.

A 4.0-litre W8 engine producing  was introduced in 2001 in a luxury version of the car that included standard 4motion all-wheel drive. This engine was intended to be a test bed for Volkswagen Group's new W engine technology, which would later make an appearance on the W12 in the Phaeton, Audi A8, and Bentley Continental GT, and the W16 engine in the Bugatti Veyron. The engine was discontinued in 2004.

B6 (Typ 3C; 2005) and B7 (2010) 

The B6 debuted at the Geneva Motor Show in March 2005, and launched in Europe in the summer of 2005 for the 2006 model year. Unlike its predecessor, the B6 Passat no longer shared its platform with Audi's equivalent model (the Audi A4). Based on a modified version of the Mk5 Golf's PQ35 platform (PQ46), the B6 featured a transverse rather than longitudinal engine layout of its predecessor, like the previous B3 and B4 generations, which were related to the A2 (Golf) platform. The PQ46 platform provided increased torsional rigidity.

The transverse-engine layout of the four-wheel drive version, marketed as 4motion, dictated a switch from the Torsen centre differential of the B5, to the Haldex Traction multi-plate clutch. The change to the Haldex system also changes the handling closer to a front-wheel drive car. Compared to the Torsen, the Haldex can direct torque more unequally to the front wheels (from 100:0 to 50:50 front-to-rear bias), thus providing a wider bias range than the 75:25 to 25:75 of the B5 Passat. Haldex is a reactive-type system, behaving as a front-wheel-drive vehicle until slippage is detected, at which point up to a maximum of 50% of the torque can be transmitted to the rear axle. See the Audi-related quattro (four-wheel-drive system) article for more information.

In the US market, a  2.0-litre turbocharged I4 is the base engine, or a  3.6-litre VR6 engine as the upgrade, with six-speed manual (only available on the base 2.0-litre turbocharged model) and automatic transmissions. As of the 2009 model year, the VR6 engine and 4motion option were no longer available in the US on the Passat sedan and wagon, but are available on the Passat CC.

In February 2008, the 2.0 FSI was replaced with the new Audi-developed 1.8-litre TSI engine and 6-speed automatic transmission. At the same time the 2.0-litre TDI engine from the Audi range, incorporating common rail injection technology superseded the existing 2.0 litre TDI units. The common rail technology uses less fuel and is quieter in operation. This engine is part of the wider Volkswagen Group policy for engine sharing.

The Passat Estate won overall winner of Practical Caravans Towcar of the Year Awards 2008 for its array of towing features such as its Trailer Stability Programme.

In Asia, the PQ46 Passat was released by FAW-VW as the Magotan, after Volkswagen's other joint venture Shanghai Volkswagen had decided to continue using the B5 platform for the Passat and the Passat Lingyu (long-wheelbase Passat). Since August 2010, the wagon version of Passat B6 will be offered in Asia, which is a fully imported model. But this car is simply called Volkswagen Variant in China, in order not to refer the name "Passat" or "Magotan".

Exclusive to Europe, Japan, Australia and New Zealand was a limited edition Passat R36, which featured a 3.6-litre V6 engine. This version of the Passat put out 300 hp, and featured dual exhaust tips, an aggressive front bonnet, and All Wheel Drive.

Passat CC 

The CC ("Comfort Coupé") is a 4-door coupé version of the Passat. It debuted at the 2008 North American International Auto Show in Detroit. Originally aimed at competing with the similarly styled Mercedes CLS, the Passat CC intends to be more stylish and luxurious than the previously released Passat B6. In the US, the name Passat was dropped, and the car was being sold as just CC. Some options specific to the CC include hands-free parking, lane-departure prevention, intelligent cruise control, and adaptive suspension. Engines offered in the CC mirror those of the regular Passat, with options of the base 2.0 litre turbocharged four-cylinder, or the optional 3.6-litre VR6, which includes 4-motion all-wheel drive.

The Chinese-made CC was released by FAW-VW on 15 July 2010. Two engine options are provided: 1.8 litre T and 2.0 litre T.

Volkswagen facelifted the Passat CC in late 2011 for the 2012 year, with styling updates akin to those of the larger Phaeton. For the updated model, Volkswagen has dropped the Passat name for all markets, now matching the Volkswagen CC branding used since 2008 in North America.

2010 facelift (Passat B7) 

The B6 Passat was facelifted by Klaus Bischoff and Walter de Silva and was unveiled at the Paris Motor Show in September 2010. Although designated "B7" by VW enthusiasts, the car is not an all-new model. The facelift resulted in new external body panels except for the roof and glasshouse, with the prominent changes to the grille and headlights. Overall height and width dimensions are unchanged from the B6 Passat, while length increases by 4 mm. New features include Adaptive Chassis Control (DCC), Dynamic Light Assist glare-free high beams, a fatigue detection system and an automatic "city emergency braking" system. It arrived at dealerships in January 2011.

The interior featured minor detail changes from the B6, although the basic dashboard design remained unchanged.

In India, the B6 version is likely to be replaced with the B7 version. The new model will be exclusive to the Indian market, and at least 100 mm longer than the European B7.

In China, the FAW-VW-built Magotan will also be replaced by a long-wheelbase version of the Passat B7. The new model will be exclusive to the Chinese market, and at least 100 mm longer than the European B7. Engines available for Magotan B7L are ranging from 1.4-litre T, 1.8-litre T to 2.0-litre T, a special-developed EA390 3.0-litre VR6 FSI engine is opted for the top model.

In Malaysia, Volkswagen Global had authorised DRB-HICOM for assembly in the Pekan facility beginning 2011. The Passat was the best-selling model of Volkswagen Malaysia in 2012 and 2013.

Passat Alltrack 

In October 2010, Volkswagen presented at the 2011 Tokyo Motor Show the Passat Alltrack. The Passat Alltrack bridges the gap between the passenger VW range and the SUV range comprising the Tiguan and Touareg. The Passat Alltrack was aimed at competing with Subaru Outback, which created a new market niche. They (Alltrack & Outback) both bear resemblance in ride height and external body kit.

The Passat Alltrack has raised ground clearance from 135 to 165 mm which improves approach angle from 13.5 to 16 degrees, departure angle from 11.9 to 13.6 degrees and ramp angle from 9.5 to 12.8 degrees when compared to the standard Passat wagon.
Passat Alltrack is the only VW in the passenger range to offer 4Motion with off-road driving programme, the off-road system works in conjunction with the ABS, electronic differential lock (EDL), DSG & hill descent assist system to control the vehicle in an off-road expedition.

The engine range of the Passat Alltrack consists of two 2.0 litre TDI with outputs of 103 kW/140 hp & 125 kW/170 hp and two petrol engines, 1.8-litre producing 118 kW/160 hp and 2.0 litre TSI producing 155 kW/207 hp. The TDI models come standard with BlueMotion Technology packages with Stop/Start system and battery regeneration mode for recovering braking energy. The two lesser powered engine variants 2.0 litre TDI and 1.8-litre TSI are only available in front wheel drive format with a manual 6 speed transmission. The rest of the range with 4Motion has a 6 speed DSG automated manual transmission, except the 2.0 litre TDI with 103 kW/140 hp has an option of 6 speed manual.

In 2012 at the New York Auto Show, VW showed a Passat Alltrack with 2.0 litre TDI 125 kW/170 hp under Alltrack Concept nameplate to gauge response for a future market in the off-road wagon segment.

DARPA driverless edition 
A driverless version of the Passat Wagon finished second in the 2007 DARPA Urban Challenge. In spring 2015, Swiss telecommunications company Swisscom tested the driverless Volkswagen Passat on the streets of Zurich.

B8 (Typ 3G; 2015) 

The eighth generation model of the Passat was introduced in November 2014 in Continental Europe and in January 2015 in the United Kingdom as a four-door saloon and estate. Following other Volkswagen Group passenger vehicles such as the Volkswagen Golf Mk7, it is based on a stretched variant of the MQB platform, a modular automobile construction platform designed for transverse, front-engined cars. To reduce weight, lightweight materials such as aluminium and vacuum-formed steel have been utilised. According to the chairman of the board of Volkswagen, Martin Winterkorn, the B8 is "a premium car without the premium price", indicating that the Passat nameplate was moved to the small car segment, as opposed to the previous generation models that were conceived as large family cars, although some auto journalists have criticised this strategy since it effectively puts the Passat in competition with the Audi A6.

The Passat was introduced with a great number of advanced driver-assistance systems, including a semi-automatic parking system, emergency driver assistant, which will automatically take control of the vehicle if the driver has suffered a medical emergency, autonomous cruise control system for highway speeds up to 210 km/h, a collision avoidance system with pedestrian monitoring and variable ratio steering marketed as "progressive steering" which will adjust the steering gear ratios in relation to the current speed.

The engine line-up of the Passat B7 was re-introduced with this generation with slightly increased power outputs, variable displacement for the 1.4-litre TSI petrol engine and two selective catalytic reduction (SCR) diesel engines, with one being twin-turbocharged. A plug-in hybrid, the Passat GTE, with an updated battery pack from the Golf GTE and Audi A3 Sportback e-tron is scheduled for launch in mid-2015 in the United Kingdom with sales commencing in 2016.

Led by new chief of design Walter de Silva and VW's acquisition of coachbuilder Bertone, the 2015 Passat won the 2015 European Car of the Year award.

The Passat B8 continues to be sold in China under the name Magotan; this version has an 80 mm longer wheelbase.

Other versions

Passat Lingyu (China; 2005–2011) 

The Passat Lingyu is a restyled version of the first generation Škoda Superb for the Chinese market. Manufactured by SAIC Volkswagen, the Passat Lingyu was introduced in 2005, succeeding the Passat B5. The car was designed by Istanbul-born car designer Murat Günak. In 2009, a facelifted version was introduced as the Passat New Lingyu (Xinlingyu). Production lasted until 2011 and replaced by the Passat NMS.

Volkswagen built 20 examples of a fuel-cell Passat Lingyu in mid-2008 to be presented at the 2008 Beijing Olympics.

Passat NMS (North America and China; 2011–present) 

The Passat branched into two models starting from 2011: one marketed in Europe, right-hand drive markets, and in China as the Magotan, and the other known as the Passat NMS that is manufactured for the North American and Chinese market. The NMS is more downscale compared to the European Passat to achieve a lower price point and penetrate the mainstream mid-size sedan market. The Passat NMS model was split again in 2019 as the Chinese version moved on to the MQB platform, while the North American model continued to use its same platform.

Known as the New Midsize Sedan (NMS) before its unveiling in January 2011, this model was designed for the North American market, replacing the B6 Passat sedan and wagon. At its introduction, the Passat NMS was part of Volkswagen Group's strategy to sell over 800,000 vehicles per year in the North American market. The Passat NMS is marketed in the North America, South Korea, Middle East, and China, with no plans for a wagon/estate version. North American, Middle Eastern and South Korean models are manufactured at its Chattanooga Assembly Plant.

In China, the new model is built by SAIC-Volkswagen in its Nanjing factory and is marketed as a more upscale model with some interior and exterior differences to the North American model, such as wood-trimmed steering wheel, rear air vents, and LED accented headlights. It was sold alongside models such as the long-wheelbase version of the European Passat known as the Magotan and a B5 Passat-based Passat Lingyu.

Facelift (North America; 2019) 

A revised Passat for the North American market was released in 2019 as a 2020 model. The 2020 Volkswagen Passat NMS featured revised styling and added standard safety and technology features, which include a suite of standard driver assistance technologies and a 6.33-inch glass-covered touchscreen infotainment system with next-generation VW CarNet 4G LTE in-vehicle telematics. The 2019 features a carryover 174-horsepower, 2.0-liter TSI I4 gasoline engine and six-speed automatic transmission. Following the 2022 model year, Volkswagen discontinued the Passat in North America due to slow sales.

Magotan (China; 2005–present)

In China, the European version Passat is sold as the VW Magotan, produced by FAW-Volkswagen. The current model, sold since 2016 is based on the B8 version of the European Passat, but with a lengthened wheelbase.

Passat (China; 2011–present) 

The Passat nameplate was first used in China in 2011, when SAIC Volkswagen began selling the North-American Passat NMS. 

In October 2018, the Chinese market 2019 Passat was unveiled, using the same Volkswagen Group MQB platform as the European Passat and VW Magotan, but is not directly based on them. As a result, despite the high physical resemblance between the Chinese and North American Passats (and both being called Passat NMS), they have now diverged and are no longer using the same platform. Trim levels are known as the 280TSI, 330TSI and 380TSI. 280TSI models receive the 1.4-litre EA211 engine, while 330TSI and 380TSI models receive the 2.0-litre EA888 engine. All models are available with 7-speed DSG gearbox as standard.

Sales

References

External links 

 
 

Passat
All-wheel-drive vehicles
Cars powered by VR engines
Cars introduced in 1973
1970s cars
1980s cars
1990s cars
2000s cars
2010s cars
Euro NCAP large family cars
Front-wheel-drive vehicles
Mid-size cars
Plug-in hybrid vehicles
Hatchbacks
Sedans
Station wagons
Police vehicles
Touring cars